The following is a list of episodes of Magkaribal. This drama premiered on June 28, 2010 and ran for 15 chapters.

Episodes Summary

External links
List of Magkaribal episodes on iMDB

Lists of Philippine drama television series episodes
Lists of soap opera episodes